Ebony Parade is a 1947 American musical compilation film made from footage of African-American performers. The 3-reel film  features jazz music from many famous acts (usually from soundies) with interstitial segments featuring Mantan Moreland as a comedic magician. Advertised as including 20 great stars, it was an Astor Pictures release. The National Museum of African American History and Culture has a poster for the film. Getty Images also has an image of a poster from the film.

Cast
Cab Calloway
Count Basie 
The Mills Brothers
Vanita Smythe 
Mantan Moreland 
Mable Lee 
Ruby Hill 
Francine Everett 
Dorothy Dandridge 
Pat Flowers 
Day, Dawn, and Dusk 
The Jubalaires

References 

1947 films
Jazz films
Documentary films about jazz music and musicians